Etonitazepipne (N-Piperidino Etonitazene) is a benzimidazole derivative with opioid effects around 100 times more potent than morphine, which has been sold over the internet as a designer drug.

See also 
 Etazene
 Etonitazepyne
 Isotonitazene
 Metonitazene
 List of benzimidazole opioids

References 

Analgesics
Designer drugs
Benzimidazole opioids
Nitro compounds
Pyrrolidines
Aromatic ethers